LEDA 135657 is a distant low surface brightness spiral galaxy located about 570 million light-years away in the constellation Cetus. It has an estimated diameter of 97,000 light-years.

See also 
 Malin 1 a giant low surface brightness galaxy discovered in 1986
 NGC 45
 Low-surface-brightness galaxy

References

External links 

Spiral galaxies
Cetus (constellation)
135657
Low surface brightness galaxies